Francis Xavier Sudartanta Hadisumarta O. Carm. (13 December 1932 – 12 February 2022) was an Indonesian Roman Catholic bishop.

Biography
Hadisumarta was born in the Dutch East Indies and was ordained to the priesthood in 1959. He served as bishop of the Roman Catholic Diocese of Malang, Indonesia, from 1973 to 1988 and as bishop of the Roman Catholic Diocese of Manokwari-Sorong, Indonesia, from 1988 until his resignation in 2003.

He died on 12 February 2022, at the age of 89.

References

1932 births
2022 deaths
20th-century Roman Catholic bishops in Indonesia
21st-century Roman Catholic bishops in Indonesia
People from East Java
Carmelite bishops